Ariyanayagam Kaveenthiran Kodeeswaran (also known as Kodeeswaran Robin ) is a Sri Lankan Tamil politician and Member of Parliament.

Kodeeswaran is a member of the Tamil Eelam Liberation Organization. He was one of the Tamil National Alliance's (TNA) candidates in Ampara District at the 2015 parliamentary election. He was elected and entered Parliament.

Electoral history

References

Living people
Members of the 15th Parliament of Sri Lanka
People from Eastern Province, Sri Lanka
Sri Lankan Tamil politicians
Tamil Eelam Liberation Organization politicians
Tamil National Alliance politicians
Year of birth missing (living people)